Patience Marie Josephine Kama Dabany (born 22 January 1941; member of the Order of Gabriela Silang), also known by the names Marie Joséphine Kama and Josephine Bongo, is a Gabonese singer and musician. Dabany served as the First Lady of Gabon from 1967 to 1987. For nearly 30 years she was married to Omar Bongo Ondimba, who was President of Gabon from 1967 to 2009. After their divorce, she successfully pursued a career in music. She is the mother of the current President of Gabon, Ali Bongo Ondimba.

Early life
Born as Marie Joséphine Kama in Brazzaville, Congo, Dabany's parents originated from the Bateke people in Haut-Ogooué region in what is now southeastern Gabon. Dabany grew up in a musical family and began to sing at an early age to her father's accordion accompaniment, while her brother played guitar. From there her path led to the church choir in Brazzaville and on to traditional song performances. Her mother was a traditional singer.

As First Lady

In 1958, she met Albert-Bernard Bongo, a young Gabonese student. At just 15 years of age, she married Albert on 31 October 1959. They had two children: a son Alain Bernard Bongo (9 February 1959) and a daughter, the late Albertine Amissa Bongo (1964–1993).

Marie Josephine Kama, later known as Josephine Bongo, was the First Lady of Gabon. She and her then-husband founded the Gabonese Democratic Party. She became involved in many social projects, including the promotion of women's rights, charities for children, etc. Working with culture she created the musical group dedicated to the Gabonese Democratic Party, Kounabeli (Superstars), where she performed as lead singer.

Musical career
In 1986 Joséphine and Albert Bongo divorced. Marie embarked on a career as a professional artist, under her new name, Patience Dabany. Her first album was Levekisha. Other albums followed such as Cheri Ton Disque Est Rayé and Associé. Her acclaimed self titled album,Patience Dabany, in 1994 was produced and mixed by Grammy winning engineer Reggie Dozier and background vocals were sung by Los Angeles based vocal trio, HARMONY, consisting of Cydney Davis, Wendy Smith and Theresa Walker who also toured with Patience during her concerts in Gabon and in California. In 1997, she released the album Nouvelle Attitude. The same year Dabany returned to her motherland and reestablished herself in Libreville. In 2001 she released Article 106. Her 2004 world music album Obomiyia allowed her to tour with James Brown in Europe. She recorded an album with Kounabeli in 2005; the song La Connaissance from this album was one of the anthems of her former husband (now using the name Omar Bongo Ondimba) used during the presidential campaign of 2005.

Patience Dabany collaborated with many artists such as El DeBarge, Tabu Ley Rochereau, and Tshala Muana. She is also the president of the Association of Gabonese Merchants and works in the field of charity. 

Having performed at Paris Olympia in 2001. In June 2011, she participated in the "Great African Night" at the Stade de France, alongside many stars of the continent. She also sang at the final of the 2012 African Nations Cup in Libreville (Gabon). On 2 November 2012, she is in Paris again for a concert at the Zenith. Patience Dabany is one of the most prolific musical ambassadors of Africa.

Honours
:
 Member of the Order of Gabriela Silang

References

External links
 
 Patience Dabany at museke african artistes
 Images of Patience Dabany can be found on SAHARAN VIBE: ALI BEN BONGO ONDIMBA

1941 births
First ladies and gentlemen of Gabon
Gabonese singers
Living people
People from Brazzaville
21st-century Gabonese people